The Manchester Phonology Meeting (abbreviated and stylised as mfm) is an annual linguistic conference, held at Hulme Hall in Manchester, in the United Kingdom, from 1993 - 2018, and at other venues at the University of Manchester from 2019. Submitted abstracts undergo an anonymous peer-review process before being selected for inclusion by an organising committee and international advisory board of prominent linguists. Presentations have, over the years, taken on a broad range of phonological topics, from phonological acquisition and the phonological description of languages to the interfaces between phonology and other subfields of linguistics such as morphology and syntax.

The Manchester Phonology Meeting is the longest-running international conference dedicated exclusively to phonology. It regularly attracts participants from all over Europe, North and South America, Asia and Africa.

The 27th conference in the series will take place between 23 and 25 May 2019.

Funding for the conference has come from a variety of sources, including the Linguistics Association of Great Britain and the British Academy.

References

External links 
 Manchester Phonology Meeting homepage

University of Manchester
Linguistics conferences